The glass headstander, (Charax gibbosus), is a species of fish  in the genus Charax. commonly known as the transparent tetra.

Description
The glass headstander can grow up to 14 cm long and weigh up to 30 grams.

Taxonomy
Eucynopotamus gibbosus and Salmo gibbosus are taxonomic synonyms for Charx gibbosus

Distribution and habitat
The glass headstander mainly lives in South America.

References

External links

Characidae
Freshwater fish of South America